Philippine School in Greece (PSG), formerly the Katipunan Philippine Cultural Academy-Philippine School (KAPHILCA-PSG) is a Philippine international school in Vyronas, Attica, Greece; it was previously in Ambelokipi, Athens. The Commission on Filipinos Overseas (CFO) supervises the school, which operates under the Cultural Section of the Philippine embassy in Athens. It is Europe's sole Philippine international school.

History
It was established on September 9, 1997, and on June 29, 1999, it was accredited by the Philippine Department of Education. It was established after a visit of Fidel V. Ramos, former President of the Philippines to Athens in June 1997.

As of 2010, about 185 students are enrolled.

See also
 Greece–Philippines relations

References

Greece–Philippines relations
Philippine international schools
International schools in Greece
1997 establishments in Greece
Educational institutions established in 1997